Susan Small may refer to:

 Susan Small (canoeist), British former canoeist
 Susan Small (fashion), British fashion label